"Shape of Things to Come" is a song written by Barry Mann and Cynthia Weil from the film Wild in the Streets, performed by the fictional band Max Frost and the Troopers on their 1968 album Shape of Things to Come, featuring a lead vocal by Harley Hatcher. The song was also released without vocals by Davie Allan and the Arrows. The song was a mere 1 minute 55 seconds in length.
The song came some 35 years after H. G. Wells' The Shape of Things to Come.

Success
The song was produced by Mike Curb for the exploitation film Wild in the Streets, where actor Christopher Jones lip syncs to Hatcher's vocal. A young Richard Pryor portrayed the drummer in Jones's band. The film was released on May 29, 1968.

Concurrent with the film's release, the song appeared as a single on Tower 419; it was backed by another song from the film, "Free Lovin'" (written by Guy Hemric and Paul Wibier). The single peaked at #22 on the Billboard Hot 100 in September 1968, and peaked at #2 on
the Canadian CHUM Charts for two consecutive weeks during the second and third week of October, 1968. and #9 on the Canadian RPM Top 100. The song remained on the US Billboard charts for a total of 12 weeks and on the RPM charts for 12 weeks.

The song subsequently appeared as the first track on the A side of the Shape of Things to Come LP, released in the wake of the single's chart success.

Other versions
Others who have performed the song include: 
George Benson
Slade 
Rich Kids
Aorta
The Graduates
Third Rail
Paul Revere and the Raiders
Glad
The Pointed Sticks
Gary Moore
The Ramones
The Fuzztones
The Urinals
The Diodes
Mod Fun
Roslyn Kind
The Vice Barons
Future
Vivian Reed
Davie Allan and the Arrows
Marshmallow Overcoat
More recently, the song has been released by: 
Thee Dirtybeats, 
Toxic Reasons
Hammer and the Nails
Janelle Monáe.

In popular culture
The song was used in the Mexican television show Ensalada de locos (1971 - 1973) among sketches.
In 2006, the Max Frost & The Troopers version of the song was used in an advertising campaign by Target Stores.
In 2021, the original version was again used in an advertising campaign by mobile payments company Square Inc.
In 2022, the original version was used in the film Apollo 10½: A Space Age Childhood.

References

External links
 
 "Shape of Things to Come" guitar tabs

See also

Songs written by Barry Mann
Songs written for films
1968 singles
Slade songs
Song recordings produced by Chas Chandler
Ramones songs
1968 songs
1970 singles
Songs with lyrics by Cynthia Weil
Fontana Records singles